The 1924 United States presidential election in Minnesota took place on November 4, 1924, in Minnesota as part of the 1924 United States presidential election. Voters chose 12 electors, or representatives to the Electoral College, who voted for president and vice president.

A rapid recovery from the depression of 1920 and 1921, despite major Republican losses during the 1922 House elections placed the Republican Party – who gained a record popular-vote majority in the 1920 election – in a secure position despite the death of President Warren G. Harding in 1923. Rises in wages and ebbing of discontent further solidified the GOP's hold on power.

More critically, the Democratic Party was mortally divided between its rural Southern faction led by William Gibbs McAdoo and its white ethnic urban northeastern faction led by New York Governor Al Smith. The rural faction was supported by the revived Ku Klux Klan and was in favour of Prohibition, whereas the white ethnic faction was firmly against the anti-Catholic Klan and opposed to Prohibition. A fierce debate ensued that saw a compromise candidate, former Congressman John W. Davis of West Virginia, nominated after one hundred and three ballots in hot summer weather at Madison Square Garden. Although West Virginia was a border state whose limited African-American population had not been disenfranchised as happened in all former Confederate States, Davis did share the extreme social conservatism of Southern Democrats of his era. He supported poll taxes, opposed women's suffrage, and believed in strictly limited government with no expansion in nonmilitary fields.

In the liberal, heavily Scandinavian Upper Midwest, Davis' social and economic views had practically no appeal. Although in September Davis underwent an extensive tour of the region and of the Great Plains, and campaigned to eliminate the income tax burden of the poorer classes, he received a mere 6.80% of the vote in Minnesota. This constitutes the second-smallest proportion of any state's popular vote received by an official on-ballot Democratic presidential nominee since the election of 1860, when the party was divided. The only smaller proportion was by Grover Cleveland in Nevada in 1892, when he received only 6.56% of the vote.

The conservatism of Coolidge and Davis made it inevitable that aging Wisconsin maverick Robert M. La Follette, Sr. would mount a third-party challenge – which La Follette had planned even before the Democratic Convention. La Follette was formally nominated on July 4 by the "Conference for Progressive Political Action" and developed a platform dedicated to eliminating child labor and American interference in Latin American political affairs, along with a formal denunciation of the Ku Klux Klan. La Follette also proposed major judicial reforms including amendments allowing congress to override judicial review and to re-enact laws declared unconstitutional. La Follette also called for election of federal judges for ten-year terms.

Davis and Coolidge both spent most of their campaign attacking La Follette as a political extremist, but nonetheless opinion polls showed that La Follette was attracting large numbers of those German-American and Scandinavian-Americans who completely deserted Cox in 1920. In September some polls had La Follette winning sufficient electoral votes to give no candidate an electoral majority and force the House to make a choice, but as polling day approached newer polls suggested incumbent President Calvin Coolidge would hold the states of Minnesota, North Dakota, South Dakota, Nevada and Montana, which La Follette had been predicted to win in August. As it turned out, Coolidge won the state over La Follette by a margin of 81,567 votes, or 9.92 percent. Nationally, the incumbent President almost equalled Harding's landslide popular vote victory, achieving a 25.22 percent lead over Davis and 382 electoral votes.

Despite Davis' shocking statewide performance – not polling twenty percent in any of Minnesota's eighty-seven counties – this election would prove the last as of 2020 when Ramsey County has not voted Democratic, for La Follette's vote would turn to beaten Democratic nominee Smith in the following election and remain with the party for many decades.

With 41.26% of the popular vote, Minnesota would prove to be La Follette's third strongest state in the 1924 election in terms of popular vote percentage after Wisconsin and North Dakota.

Results

Results by county

See also
 United States presidential elections in Minnesota

References

Notes

1924
Min
1924 Minnesota elections